Lise-Lotte Öberg, married surname: Kinding, is a Swedish former competitive figure skater. She is a three-time (1971–73) Nordic champion and a four-time (1973–76) Swedish national champion, representing Malmbergets AIF (1968–70), GF Idrott Landskrona (1971), Göteborgs KK (1972–73), and Isblommans KK (1974–76).

She began coaching in 1976 and joined The Royal Glenora Club in Edmonton, Alberta, Canada in 1998. She and her husband, Swedish hockey coach Björn Kinding, have two daughters, Mikaela and Tiffany.

Competitive highlights

References 

1950s births
Swedish female single skaters
Living people
Swedish emigrants to Canada
Figure skaters from Edmonton
20th-century Swedish women